A detective is a professional investigator.

Detective(s) or The Detective(s) may also refer to:

Films 
(Chronological)
Detectives (1928 film), an American silent comedy film by MGM, directed by Chester Franklin
Detective (1954 film), an Argentine film
The Detective (1954 film) or Father Brown, a British mystery comedy
Detective (1958 film), Indian film
The Detective (1968 film), an American film based on the Roderick Thorpe novel (see below)
Detectives (1969 film), a West German crime film
Détective, a 1985 French film directed by Jean-Luc Godard
Detective (2007 film), an Indian Malayalam film
The Detective (2007 film), a Hong Kong neo-noir mystery thriller
Detective (2020 film), an Indian Bengali film

Literature
 Detective (novel), a 1997 novel by Arthur Hailey
 The Detective (novel), a 1966 novel by Roderick Thorp

Television 
 Detective (TV series) (1964–1969), a BBC TV anthology series that adapted different detectives by different authors such as Anthony Read 
 The Detectives (1959 TV series), an American crime drama TV series
 The Detectives (1993 TV series), a British sitcom starring Jasper Carrott and Robert Powell
 The Detectives (2015 TV series), a BBC documentary series filmed in Manchester
 The Detectives (2018 TV series), a CBC true crime series filmed in Canada

Other uses in arts, entertainment, and media 
 Detective (band), an American rock band
 The Detective (video game), a 1986 video game

See also 
 
 
 Detective Story (disambiguation)
 True Detective (disambiguation)